Thunder Pass is a 1954 American western film directed by Frank McDonald and starring Dane Clark, Dorothy Patrick and Andy Devine.

Plot
A cavalry unit escorts a group of civilians through dangerous territory inhabited by Indians on the warpath

Cast
Dane Clark as Captain Dave Storm
 Dorothy Patrick as Murdock
 Andy Devine as Injun
 Raymond Burr as Tulsa
 Charles Fredericks as 	McCurdy
 Mary Ellen Kay as Charity Hemp
 John Carradine as 	Bergstrom
 Raymond Hatton as 	Ancient
 Nestor Paiva as 	Daniel Slaughter
 Tom Hubbard as Barnett
 Rick Vallin as 	Reeger
 Tommy Cook as Rogers
 Paul McGuire as Charlie Hemp
 Elizabeth Harrower as Mrs. Hemp
 William Wilkerson as Chief Growling Bear
 Gordon Wynn as Dalstead 
 Fred Gabourie as 	Indian
 Kenneth Alton as Black Eagle

Production
Filming started 17 May 1954 in Apple Valley and took 12 days.

References

External links

1954 films
American Western (genre) films
Films directed by Frank McDonald
1954 Western (genre) films
Lippert Pictures films
American black-and-white films
1950s English-language films
1950s American films